Similar to computer-supported collaborative learning (CSCL), virtual collaborative learning environments aim to produce technology-based learning processes where participants can work together as a group to construct and share knowledge . Such environments “provide a rich opportunity for collaborative knowledge building, particularly through peer-to-peer dialogue.

In context of virtual collaborative learning, virtual structures and spaces are designed for individual and collaborative learning activities .

Virtual collaborative learning in terms of problem-oriented project work in groups facilitated is becoming increasingly common in distributed learning settings where participants are physically in different locations.

The basic affordances of virtual collaborative learning are to have the ability to synchronously and asynchronously communicate via an array of electronic tools, e.g.: group and discussion chats, wikis, and blogs, where application transparency is essential. The main barrier to virtual collaborative learning is the difficulty in achieving agreement when diverse viewpoints, cultural boundaries, acuity of thoughts, or different working and cognitive learning styles exist.

Virtual collaborative learning systems can be divided into two main categories: action-oriented from where the participant’s knowledge is captured and shared or text-oriented which focuses on participants sharing knowledge via written communication. Within these categories, the participants may
use a range of tools for both synchronous (e.g. chat, telephone conference, video conference) and asynchronous (e.g. threaded forum, document pool, e-mail)
communication.

The evolution of virtual collaborative learning systems will depend upon the participant's cognitive processes. The participant may adapt to the technology to change the way that they learn or the participant may utilize their learning and collaborative situation to optimize use the technology.

See also 

 Collaborative workspace
 Computer-supported collaborative learning
 E-Learning
 Virtual Learning Environment

References

External links 

1. Researching "collaborative knowledge building" in formal distance learning environments. Vanessa Paz Dennen, Trena M. Paulus. Page 96.
 
2. Proactive Behaviour May Lead to Failure in Virtual Project-Based Collaborative Learning. Pernille Bjørn, Morten Hertzum. Page 1.

3. Collaborative Learning Team PBWiki. DePaul University's PM440 Fall 2008 Collaborative Learning Team, Tony Feldhaus, Ruth Hong, Zoaib Mirza, Ahmad Noordin. http://pm440.pbwiki.com/CLT

4. Designing Collaborative Learning Systems: Current Trends & Future Research Agenda. Angelique Dimitracopoulou. Page 116.

5. Principles and Grand Challenges for the Futures: A Prospectus for the Computer-Supported Collaborative Learning (CSCL) Community" Eric Hamilton (2007).

6.

7. Virtual Learning – Everything You Need to Know Article By CloudShare

Notes

Virtual learning environments